Nyzhniohirskyi Raion is one of the 25 regions of the Autonomous Republic of Crimea, a territory recognised by a majority of countries as part of Ukraine and incorporated by Russia as the Republic of Crimea. It is situated in the north-eastern part of the republic. The administrative centre of the raion is the urban-type settlement of Nyzhniohirskyi. Population:

Localities 
 Drofino

References

Raions of Crimea